Malcolm George Thompson (19 October 1946 – 24 October 2014) was an English footballer. Whilst with Scarborough, he scored the winning goal in the 1973 FA Trophy Final, in extra-time against Wigan Athletic.

He played for Goole Town, Hartlepool United, Corby Town and Scarborough. He made 46 appearances for Hartlepool in the Football League, scoring 9 goals.

Notes

1946 births
2014 deaths
Sportspeople from Beverley
Footballers from the East Riding of Yorkshire
English footballers
Association football forwards
Goole Town F.C. players
Hartlepool United F.C. players
Corby Town F.C. players
Scarborough F.C. players
English Football League players